Bunda Town is a large town and capital of Bunda District. It is located in Mara Region in the United Republic of Tanzania.

The town was previously an administrative part of the Bunda District, but in 2007 it was parted from the District. The town had a population of 58,390 according to the 2012 census.

Bunda has had a friendly relationship with the Norwegian Municipality Tingvoll since 1990. In 2007, the partnership was expanded through a program called "Municipal International Co-Operation". The overall strategic goal for the programme is to improve municipal governance and services, and the method is to stimulate the collaboration between local authorities in Tingvoll and Bunda. There are 15 other pairs of municipalities included in the programme.

References

Populated places in Mara Region